Astraea heliotropium, common name the sunburst star turban or the circular saw shell, is a large sea snail, a marine gastropod mollusc of the family Turbinidae, the turbans and star snails.

This large species was brought to Europe for the first time by the famous Captain Cook.

Shell description
The height of the shell is up to 60 mm, and the width is up to 120 mm.
The large shell has a depressed-conic shape. Below widely it is umbilicate and concave. The spire is dome-shaped, and consists of 5 convex whorls. The suture is rendered zigzag by the prominent compressed triangular recurved vaulted spines which arm the acutely carinated periphery. The whorls above and below contain numerous spiral series of granules. The wide umbilicus is deep, and coarsely obliquely striate within. The aperture is transversely oval, oblique, pearly within. The peristome is continuous. The columella is slightly dilated, impinging upon the umbilicus. The color pattern is brownish or purplish above, light below.

Distribution 
This marine species is endemic to New Zealand.

References

 Williams, S.T. (2007). Origins and diversification of Indo-West Pacific marine fauna: evolutionary history and biogeography of turban shells (Gastropoda, Turbinidae). Biological Journal of the Linnean Society, 2007, 92, 573–592.
 Spencer, H.; Marshall. B. (2009). All Mollusca except Opisthobranchia. In: Gordon, D. (Ed.) (2009). New Zealand Inventory of Biodiversity. Volume One: Kingdom Animalia. 584 pp

Further reading 
 Powell A W B, New Zealand Mollusca, William Collins Publishers Ltd, Auckland, New Zealand 1979 
 Glen Pownall, New Zealand Shells and Shellfish, Seven Seas Publishing Pty Ltd, Wellington, New Zealand 1979

External links 

 

heliotropium
Endemic fauna of New Zealand
Gastropods described in 1784
Endemic molluscs of New Zealand